Delvanita Santos Souza (born 16 April 1981), commonly known as Deva, is a Brazilian women's international footballer who plays as a midfielder. She is a member of the Brazil women's national football team. She was part of the team at the 1999 FIFA Women's World Cup. On club level she plays for Lusa Sant'Anna in Brazil.

References

1981 births
Living people
Brazilian women's footballers
Brazil women's international footballers
Place of birth missing (living people)
1999 FIFA Women's World Cup players
Women's association football midfielders